Dmitri Olegovich Orlov, (Дмитрий Олегович Орлов, born September 19, 1966 in Vladimir, Russia) is a Russian mathematician, specializing in algebraic geometry. He is known for the Bondal-Orlov reconstruction theorem (2001).

Education and career
In 1988 Orlov graduated from the Faculty of Mechanics and Mathematics of  Moscow State University. There he received his Candidate of Sciences degree (PhD) 1991 with thesis Производные категории когерентных пучков, моноидальные преобразования и многообразия Фано (Derived categories of coherent sheaves, monoidal transformations and Fano varieties) under Vasilii Alekseevich Iskovskikh (and Alexey Igorevich Bondal).
At the Steklov Institute of Mathematics, Orlov was from April 1996 to April 2011 a researcher in the Algebra Department and is since April 2011 the head of the Algebraic Geometry Department. In 2002 Orlov received his Doctor of Sciences degree (habilitation) with thesis Производные категории когерентных пучков и эквивалентности между ними (Derived categories of coherent sheaves and equivalences between them). In 2002 he was, with A. Bondal, an Invited Speaker with talk Derived categories of coherent sheaves at the International Congress of Mathematicians in Beijing.

Orlov's research deals with homological algebra, (derived categories, triangulated categories), algebraic geometry (derived algebraic geometry, homological mirror symmetry, quasicoherent sheaves, and noncommutative geometry.

He was elected on December 20, 2011 a corresponding member and on 15 November 2019 a full member of the Russian Academy of Sciences.

Selected publications
with A. Bondal: Semi-orthogonal decomposition for algebraic varieties, Arxiv, 1995
with A. Bondal: Reconstruction of a variety from the derived category and groups of autoequivalences, Compositio Math., vol. 125, 2001, pp. 327–344, Arxiv
with A. I. Bondal: Derived categories of coherent sheaves, Proc. Internat. Congress of Mathematicians, Peking, 2002, Arxiv
Quasi-coherent sheaves in commutative and non-commutative geometry, Izv. RAN. Ser. Mat., vol. 67,  2003, pp. 119–138
Derived categories of coherent sheaves and equivalences between them, Russian Mathematical Surveys, vol. 58, 2003, p. 511
with A. N. Kapustin: Lectures on mirror symmetry, derived categories, and D-branes, Russian Mathematical Surveys, vol. 59, 2004, pp. 907–940, Arxiv
Derived categories of coherent sheaves and motives, Russian Mathematical Surveys, vol. 60, 2005, pp. 1242–1244, Arxiv
with V. A. Lunts, A. I. Efimov: Deformation theory of objects in homotopy and derived categories, Part 1, Advances in Mathematics, vol. 222, 2009, pp. 359–401, Arxiv, Part 2, Advances in Mathematics, vol. 224, 2010, pp. 45–102, Arxiv, Part 3, Advances in Mathematics, vol. 226, 2011, pp. 3857–3911, Arxiv
with Valery A. Lunts: Uniqueness of enhancement for triangulated categories, J. Amer. Math. Soc., vol. 23, 2010, pp. 853–908,  Arxiv
Formal completions and idempotent completions of triangulated categories of singularities, Advances in Mathematics, vol. 226, 2011, pp. 206–217, Arxiv
Landau-Ginzburg Models, D-branes, and Mirror Symmetry, Mat. Contemp., vol. 41, 2012, pp. 75–112, Arxiv
 with Mohammed Abouzaid, Denis Auroux, Alexander I. Efimov, and Ludmil Katzarkov: Homological mirror symmetry for punctured spheres, J. Amer. Math. Soc. vol. 26, 2013, pp. 1051-1083 
Derived noncommutative schemes, geometric realizations, and finite dimensional algebras, Russian Math. Surveys, vol. 73, 2018, pp. 865–918, Arxiv

References

External links
 

1966 births
Living people
Moscow State University alumni
Academic staff of the Steklov Institute of Mathematics
Soviet mathematicians
20th-century Russian mathematicians
21st-century Russian mathematicians
Algebraic geometers